Junoon (in Arabic) may refer to:

Film
Junoon (1978 film), a Hindi film by Shyam Benegal
Junoon (1992 film), a Hindi horror film by Mahesh Bhatt
Junoon (2002 film), a Bollywood film of 2002

Music
Junoon (Abhijeet Sawant album), 2007
Junoon (band), a Pakistani rock band
Junoon (Junoon album), 1991 self-titled album by the band

Television
Junoon (1994 TV series), a Doordarshan television series
Junoon (2008 TV series), a NDTV Imagine television series

See also
 Junun (disambiguation)
 Majnu (disambiguation)
 Jinn (disambiguation)